Milldam Rice Mill and Rice Barn, also known as Kinloch Plantation, is a historic rice plantation property and national historic district located near Georgetown, Georgetown County, South Carolina.  The district encompasses 1 contributing building, 1 contributing site, and 3 contributing structures. This rice mill and rice barn are associated with Milldam, one of several productive rice plantations on the Santee River. Agricultural features include examples of historic ricefields, including canals, dikes (including remnants of a dike hand-built by slaves) and trunks. The Rice Barn was destroyed by Hurricane Hugo in 1989.

It was listed on the National Register of Historic Places in 1988.

References

Plantations in South Carolina
Historic districts on the National Register of Historic Places in South Carolina
Barns on the National Register of Historic Places in South Carolina
Agricultural buildings and structures on the National Register of Historic Places in South Carolina
National Register of Historic Places in Georgetown County, South Carolina
Buildings and structures in Georgetown County, South Carolina